The men's singles tennis event at the 2013 Summer Universiade was held from July 8 to 16 at the Tennis Academy in Kazan, Russia.

Seeds
All seeds receive a bye into the second round.

Draw

Finals

Top half

Section 1

Section 2

Section 3

Section 4

Bottom half

Section 5

Section 6

Section 7

Section 8

Consolation draw

Consolation finals

Consolation main draw

Top half

Bottom half

References
Main Draw
Consolation Draw

External links
2013 Summer Universiade – Tennis

Tennis at the 2013 Summer Universiade